Jon Allen Husted (born August 25, 1967) is an American politician serving as the 66th lieutenant governor of Ohio, since 2019. He was previously the 53rd Ohio Secretary of State. A member of the Republican Party, he previously represented the 6th District of the Ohio Senate (a portion of Montgomery County) from 2009 to 2011 and was a member of the Ohio House of Representatives from 2001 to 2009. From 2005 to 2009, Husted served as Speaker of the Ohio House of Representatives and remains the 7th youngest person to ever become Ohio House Speaker. Husted was elected Ohio Secretary of State in 2010 and re-elected in 2014. He was a candidate in the Republican Party primary for Governor of Ohio in the 2018 election but later announced that he would instead run for lieutenant governor of Ohio as Attorney General Mike DeWine's running mate.

Personal life
Husted was born in the Detroit area in 1967 and was immediately placed for adoption. He has stated that his biological father did not want him and his biological mother was unable to care for him. He was adopted by Jim and Judy Husted and raised in the Northwest Ohio Community of Montpelier, Ohio as the oldest of three children. His father was a machine operator. Husted cites his experience having been adopted as a child as the foundation for his staunch opposition to abortion.

Education 
Husted graduated from Montpelier High School in 1985.

He later received both a bachelor's and master's degree from the University of Dayton where he played on the Dayton Flyers Football team. His senior year, the team won the 1989 NCAA Division III National Championship Game in Phoenix City, Alabama.

Career
While completing his master's degree at the University of Dayton, Husted was offered a job on the football coaching staff at the University of Toledo, but instead chose to work on a local political campaign. He then stayed in the Dayton area and worked for Montgomery County Commissioner Don Lucas and was eventually named Vice-President of Business and Economic Development at the Dayton-Area Chamber of Commerce, a position he held until seeking public office as State Representative in 2000.

Family 
Jon Husted married his wife, Tina, in 2006. He is the father of three children. The Husted family lives in the Columbus-area suburb of Upper Arlington.

Political career
After working for the Dayton-Area Chamber of Commerce and turning down an opportunity to coach football at the University of Toledo, Husted ran for office in 2000 in a five-way race for state representative, defeating his closest opponent by over 12 percent of the vote. He went on to serve as Speaker of the Ohio House of Representatives, State Senator and Ohio Secretary of State.

Ohio Secretary of State 
Husted was first elected Ohio Secretary of State in 2010 after defeating Democratic challenger Maryellen O'Shaughnessy by nearly a half-million votes. In this role, Husted served as the swing state's chief elections official. The office also serves as the filing location for new businesses in Ohio.

He was re-elected in 2014 against the Democratic challenger, then-State Senator Nina Turner by over 700,000 votes.

Financial management 
A fiscal conservative, Husted cut his office's budget by $14.5 million during his first term and reduced the size of his staff by one-third. After running a surplus for the first six years of his two terms as Secretary of State, he made the unprecedented request to have 100% of his office's taxpayer funding cut for the remainder of his term, opting instead to spend down his office's savings.

Voting issues 
As the top election official in the swing state of Ohio, Husted, like his recent predecessors, was at the center of a number of voting rights controversies including those over the days and hours of early voting and the rules for filling out absentee and provisional ballots.

While voting rights groups contended his term was mired with voter-suppression tactics, Husted responded consistently with his mantra that Ohio should be a place where it is "both easy to vote and hard to cheat."

Shortly after taking office, Husted set uniform days and hours for voting across the state, replacing the prior system that allowed each county board of elections to set their own days and hours for early voting. Chris Redfern, then Chairman of the Ohio Democratic Party stated Husted had been looking for a way to chip away at the number of days and hours." The Cleveland Plain Dealer quoted Husted during a press conference as saying, "The bottom line is the antagonists have made an issue about the fact that voters aren't being treated fairly, that they aren't being treated the same. Today we're treating voters everywhere the same."

Democrats complained that Husted's uniform hours would disenfranchise urban voters with long lines and curtailed access, while Republicans stated that the directive provided for ample early voting hours.

Husted's directive was covered by a wide variety of Ohio media. The Akron Beacon Journal said "Jon Husted has leveled the field for early voting hours." The Cleveland Plain Dealer wrote "What Husted has ordered may not completely satisfy anyone, but at least it treats everyone equally" and the Columbus Dispatch said that "Ohio Secretary of State Jon Husted has struck a fair compromise by standardizing early-voting hours throughout the state."

The 2016 Pew Charitable Trust's Elections Performance Index showed that Ohio's average wait time at the polls on Election Day had decreased in recent years and was below the national average. Husted boasted about this ranking in a press release following the biannual release of the national rankings.

On March 7, 2016, the ACLU of Ohio sent a letter to Husted's office indicating their opinion that 17-year-olds should be allowed to vote in the 2016 primary March 15. On March 9, lawyers on behalf of Democratic presidential candidate Bernie Sanders filed a lawsuit against Husted's office. On March 11, an Ohio judge ruled that 17-year-olds could vote in the primary.

Business services 

All Ohio businesses are required to maintain a business registration with the Secretary of State's Office and the business services division was the focus of a large number of changes after Husted took office in 2011. In 2013, he launched the Ohio Business Central program, which allowed businesses to file the necessary paperwork with the state online.

The change was supported by the Ohio Manufacturers' Association, Ohio Chamber of Commerce, and the Columbus Chamber of Commerce, who stated that "by utilizing technology to improve the services available from the Secretary of State's Office, Ohio is now in a position to roll out the red carpet to business and job creation by cutting red tape."

Husted also reduced the fee for starting a new business in Ohio by 21 percent and launched a partnership with Google's Get Your Business Online initiative which directed new business filers to free business startup resources offered through the web giant. This announcement drew support and praise from Urban Leagues across Ohio for making it "easier for businesses to succeed." Husted's office estimated the move would save Ohio businesses $2 million each year based on growth rates at the time.

Husted leaned heavily on technology in his efforts to streamline the operation of his office, which allowed him to reduce spending over his predecessor, Democrat Jennifer Brunner, by $14.5 million in his first term. The cuts, heavily driven by staff reductions, received some criticism by labor groups. In 2015, Husted announced he would close his office's in-house business call center and instead contract with a nonprofit organization in northeast Ohio called the Cleveland Sight Center, which employs individuals who are blind or have significant visual impairments. In an interview with the Columbus Dispatch, Husted's spokesman said it was part of the Secretary's mission to offer better services at a lower cost to taxpayers.

According to the Cleveland Sight Center, their call center was able to answer Secretary of State calls within 54 seconds, while the old, in-house call center Husted eliminated maintained an average of 10 minutes.

Opposition to pay-to-play for school extra-curricular activities 
During his time as Secretary of State, Husted became a vocal advocate for the elimination of pay-to-participate fees for extra-curricular activities in Ohio schools, such as sports and band. Husted said at the time that his own experiences as a student athlete in both high school and college helped to shape his view that extra-curricular experiences develop good character skills and a strong work ethic that we should want to instill into all students in their younger years. In an op-ed for the Toledo Blade, Husted wrote that "having these qualities in your life is what makes you a good student, a good employee, a good spouse, a good parent, and a better person. If we believe that character development is just as important as academic development, then we should stop charging fees that serve as a barrier to success."

In an interview with the Columbus Dispatch, he said loved playing sports but was a "terrible student" up until his sophomore year of high school. "Eventually, when I learned how important my grades were going to be to playing college sports, the light bulb came on and I learned to focus on it," said Husted, who would go on to become an All-American defensive back for the University of Dayton. Husted supported the legislative efforts of State Senator Cliff Hite (R–Findlay), which sought to restrict school districts' ability to charge participation fees, though the legislation did not make it out of committee.

Support for domestic violence survivors 
In September 2016, Husted launched a program called "Safe at Home." The program's stated goal was to give victims of domestic violence and human trafficking the ability to apply for a confidential address through the Secretary of State's office that they can use when interacting with government agencies to avoid the possibility of their actual home address becoming a public record.

Husted said there were eligible voters choosing to not register out of fear for their own safety. "It is unacceptable that there are those in America who are forced to choose between their personal liberties and their personal safety," Husted said in a statement about the program.

In Ohio, the voter rolls are a public record, so without the Safe at Home program, the only way to shield your personal information was to not register to vote at all. There were 38 other states with similar programs when Ohio's launched.

Lieutenant Governor 
In a large field of Republicans looking to be the next governor of Ohio after John Kasich, Husted was a serious challenger from SW Ohio. Mid-way through the primary, Husted announced that he was dropping out of the gubernatorial race to run as a combined ticket with candidate Mike DeWine. After winning, DeWine announced that Husted would lead the newly created InnovateOhio.

In January 2021, Senator Rob Portman announced that he would not seek re-election and Husted's name was floated as a possible replacement. After 48 hours, Husted issued a statement that he would not be seeking higher office, but was committed to the work he was doing as lieutenant governor.

Controversies

Budget
In 2005, while representing the 41st Ohio house district, Husted was criticized for a fishing trip during Memorial Day Weekend, which included three Columbus lobbyists in the middle of an important budget debate, in which the lobbyists had a stake in the budget outcome. Husted had initially denied the lobbyists were involved in politics. Following criticism of his ethics, Husted increased his personal reimbursements for the trips.

FirstEnergy
In 2008, as Speaker of the House, Husted was accused of being "in sync" with FirstEnergy in their energy regulation dispute with Gov. Ted Strickland and the state's largest manufacturers. Husted supported FirstEnergy's position over the regulation sought by the Governor and manufacturers to control FirstEnergy's highest rates in the state. Since 2001, Husted has accepted $39,500 from FirstEnergy's political action committee, and since 2008, has accepted $71,000 from FirstEnergy employees.

Residency
In October 2008, Husted became the subject of an electoral investigation concerning his residency. The Secretary of State's office ultimately cast a vote which broke the tie of an elections panel voting on the matter in 2009, deciding that he was not a resident of the district he represented, based on utility bills which highlighted his official residence hadn't been used for quite some time. In October 2009, the Ohio Supreme Court reversed the decision finding in favor of the Secretary of State.

Heartland Bank Director
In March 2022, while still serving as lt. Governor of Ohio, Husted was appointed to a paid position on the board of directors for Heartland Bank ltd. In an apparent conflict of interest, the appointment was not announced until May 17, 2022. As of May 22, 2022, the governors office has not made any official comment about the move.

National Cash Register
At the end of 2004, Husted requested the use of National Cash Register's private jet to attend the Alamo Bowl in San Antonio. He was later criticized for this action.

Electoral history

*2000 election notes: Richard Hartmann received 3,934 votes, Bryan Carey (L) received 904 votes and Charles Turner (N) received 705 votes.

References

External links
Senator Jon Husted at Ohio Senate
Husted for Ohio - Campaign website
Representative Jon A. Husted (OH) at Project Vote Smart
Follow the Money - Jon Husted
2006 2004 2002 HD-37 2002 HD-412000 campaign contributions

|-

|-

1967 births
21st-century American politicians
American adoptees
Lieutenant Governors of Ohio
Living people
Republican Party members of the Ohio House of Representatives
Republican Party Ohio state senators
People from Kettering, Ohio
People from Montpelier, Ohio
People from Royal Oak, Michigan
People from Upper Arlington, Ohio
Secretaries of State of Ohio
Speakers of the Ohio House of Representatives
University of Dayton alumni